"Thunder in the Rain" is a song co-written and recorded by American country music artist Kane Brown. It was released on August 22, 2016 as the debut radio single from his 2016 self-titled debut album. Brown wrote the song with Josh Hoge and the song's producer Matt McVaney. On December 1, 2016, Brown performed the song on the fourteenth season of The Ellen DeGeneres Show in promotion of his debut album.

Critical reception
Markos Papadatos of the Digital Journal gave the song a favorable review, rating it 4.5 out of 5 stars and comparing the song to Brown's earlier single "Used to Love You Sober". He concluded his review by writing "Overall, Kane Brown is rocking on his new single "Thunder in the Rain." He is an artist that can do no wrong with whatever music he puts out." Billy Dukes of Taste of Country was similarly favorable, writing "Brown is at his best with help. "Thunder in the Rain" is an uptempo country mix that charges forward like a herd of horses".

Commercial performance
The song has sold 66,000 copies in the United States as of January 2017.

Chart performance

Certifications

References

2016 songs
2016 singles
Kane Brown songs
RCA Records Nashville singles
Songs written by Kane Brown
Songs written by Josh Hoge